The Lausanne–Bercher line is a metre gauge railway line in the canton of Vaud in Switzerland.

History 

After an initial test train ran between Lausanne-Chauderon station and Prilly-Chasseur on 3 October 1873, the first section of line came into service from Lausanne to Cheseaux on 4 November. The line through to Échallens opened in June 1874. Under a legally separate entity, the route to Bercher was completed and opened on 28 November 1889.

At the Lausanne end of the line, developments came later. Chauderon station was moved underground and the original station razed in 1995. Trains continued to terminate at Chauderon until 2000, when an extension to Lausanne-Flon station opened, permitting interchange with the Lausanne Métro.

Future 
Together, the railway company, the canton, and the city of Lausanne have plans to upgrade the line to permit more frequent trains. Building of a new double track tunnel between Chauderon and Montétan stations is expected to take place by 2022, permitting up to 8 trains to run per hour in each direction on the urban section as far as Cheseaux-sur-Lausanne.

References

External links 
 
 Official web site of the LEB (in French)

Metre gauge railways in Switzerland
Railway lines in Switzerland
Transport in the canton of Vaud
1500 V DC railway electrification
Underground commuter rail